Hotel Row is both a National Register and locally listed historic district consisting of one block of early 20th-century commercial buildings, three to four stories high, located on Mitchell Street west of Forsyth Street in the South Downtown district of Atlanta. The buildings were originally hotels with ground level retail shops built to serve the needs of passengers from Terminal Station, opened in 1905. The buildings are the most intact row of early 20th-century commercial structures in Atlanta's original business district. The decline of Hotel Row began in the 1920s due to the increased availability of automobile transportation and the construction of the Spring Street viaduct, which made getting to hotels in the northern part of the city easier. In the 1950s and 1960s, the increase in air travel led ultimately to the demolition of Terminal Station in 1971.

The district is architecturally significant because the structures that make up the block retain most of their original historic architectural character. Several structures were developed by Samuel Inman and Walker Inman, two of Atlanta's most prominent businessmen, and the majority of the structures were designed by the leading architects of the period. They typify the early 20th-century commercial structures once common in Atlanta but now rare because of extensive redevelopment. With Atlanta's massive gentrification, plans were underway to convert some of the buildings into lofts, however these plans ultimately stalled as a result of the Late-2000s recession.

Buildings
Buildings in Hotel Row are:

References

National Register of Historic Places in Atlanta
Buildings designated early commercial in the National Register of Historic Places
Neighborhoods in Atlanta
Willis F. Denny buildings
Roads in Atlanta
Historic districts in Downtown Atlanta